On September 18, 1970, American musician Jimi Hendrix died in London at the age of 27. One of the 1960s' most influential guitarists, he was described by the Rock and Roll Hall of Fame as "arguably the greatest instrumentalist in the history of rock music."

For some days prior to his death, Hendrix had been in poor health, in part from fatigue caused by overwork, a chronic lack of sleep, and an assumed influenza-related illness. Insecurities about his personal relationships, as well as disillusionment with the music industry, had also contributed to his frustration. Although the details of his final hours and death are disputed, Hendrix spent much of his last day alive with Monika Dannemann. In the morning hours of September18, Dannemann found Hendrix unresponsive in her apartment at the Samarkand Hotel, 22Lansdowne Crescent, Notting Hill. She called for an ambulance at 11:18 a.m., and Hendrix was taken to St Mary Abbots Hospital, where an attempt was made to resuscitate him. He was pronounced dead at 12:45 p.m.

The post-mortem examination concluded that Hendrix aspirated his own vomit and died of asphyxia while intoxicated with barbiturates. At the inquest, the coroner, finding no evidence of suicide, and lacking sufficient evidence of the circumstances, recorded an open verdict. Dannemann stated that Hendrix had taken nine of her prescribed Vesparax sleeping tablets, 18 times the recommended dosage.

On October 1, 1970, Hendrix was interred at Greenwood Cemetery in Renton, Washington. In 1992, his former girlfriend, Kathy Etchingham, asked British authorities to reopen the investigation into Hendrix's death. A subsequent inquiry by Scotland Yard proved inconclusive, and in 1993 they decided against proceeding with an investigation.

Background

During the week before his death, he was dealing with two pending lawsuits: one a paternity case, and the other a recording contract dispute that was due to be heard by a UK High Court the following week. He was also troubled with wanting to leave his manager, Michael Jeffery. Hendrix was fatigued and suffering from poor health, owing in part to severe exhaustion caused by overworking, a chronic lack of sleep, and a persistent illness assumed to be influenza-related. Lacking trusting personal relationships, his insecurities about the future and disillusionment with the music industry contributed to his frustration.

On September 11, 1970, Hendrix gave his final interview in his suite at the Cumberland Hotel in London, where he talked with Keith Altham, a journalist for Record Mirror. During the interview, Hendrix confirmed reports that Billy Cox, the bass player in his band, the Jimi Hendrix Experience, was leaving. Cox, who had been suffering from severe exhaustion and was exhibiting symptoms of paranoia, mutually agreed with Hendrix that they should suspend their plans to collaborate musically. When Altham asked Hendrix: "Do you feel any kind of compulsion to prove yourself as King Guitar", Hendrix replied: "No, I don't even let that bother me. Because they say a lot of things about people that, if they let it bother them, they wouldn't even be around today ... King Guitar now? Wow, that's a bit heavy." Altham also suggested that Hendrix invented psychedelic music, to which he laughed and replied: "A mad scientist approach ... I don't consider [my music] the invention of psychedelic, it's just asking a lot of questions."

The following day, Hendrix received a phone call from one of his girlfriends, Devon Wilson, who had become jealous after hearing rumors that he was dating another woman, Kirsten Nefer. Nefer recalled: "I heard Jimi talk to Devon ... she was mad ... she went into fits ... Jimi said 'Devon, get off my back. Hendrix was scheduled to perform in Rotterdam on September 13, but the show, along with three others, was cancelled because of Cox's incapacitation. During the evening of September 13, Nefer visited Hendrix at the Cumberland. After informing him that she would have to go back to work that evening, he convinced her to phone her boss, actor George Lazenby, and ask for the night off. Lazenby became angry and shouted over the phone to Nefer: "You're nothing but a fucking groupie", which Hendrix overheard. The exchange upset him, and he told Nefer: "Don't you ever go out to that guy again". Nefer explained to him that she had spent six months working on a film with Lazenby and that she did not want to quit her job; Hendrix eventually agreed. Nefer spent the night with him and left in the morning.

Hendrix spent most of the early afternoon and evening of September 14 discussing his career plans with the record producer Alan Douglas. In the early morning hours of September 15, he went to London's Heathrow Airport with Douglas, who was returning to New York. Hendrix's confidante Sharon Lawrence was in London, and spoke with him that day. Lawrence commented: "Jimi tracked me down, detailing his pressures and discussing the 'so-called friends'. He was jittery and angry." According to Lawrence, Hendrix told her: "I can't sleep. I can't focus to write any songs." Later that afternoon, his girlfriend Monika Dannemann arrived at the Cumberland. She and Hendrix then drove to her apartment in the Samarkand Hotel, 22 Lansdowne Crescent, Notting Hill.

During the afternoon of September 15, Hendrix was asked by his friend Eric Burdon, formerly of the Animals, if he wanted to participate in a jam session at Ronnie Scott's Jazz Club with Burdon's newly formed band, War. Hendrix accepted, but when he arrived at the club that evening, he was not allowed to play owing to his apparently drug-related disorientation. Burdon commented: "Jimi came down and was well out of it. He ... was wobbling too much to play, so I told him to come back the following night." Hendrix returned the next night and presented a healthier appearance. The crowd was enthusiastic and impressed by his performance despite his uncharacteristically subdued guitar playing when he sat in with War on "Tobacco Road" and "Mother Earth". This was the last time Hendrix played guitar in public.

Final hours

Late morning and early afternoon

Although the details of Hendrix's last day and death are unclear and widely disputed, he had spent much of September 17 in London with Monika Dannemann. He awoke late that morning at Dannemann's apartment in the Samarkand Hotel. By around 2:00p.m., he was sitting in a garden area outside the apartment enjoying some tea while she took photographs of him holding his favorite Fender Stratocaster guitar that he called "Black Beauty". In the opinion of author Tony Brown, "Jimi doesn't look particularly healthy in these photographs: his face seems a little puffy and on only  a few of the pictures does he attempt to smile."

According to Dannemann, by 3:00p.m. they had left the apartment to use a bank. They continued on to Kensington Market, where Hendrix signed an autograph for a young boy, purchased a leather jacket, and ordered some shoes. He also briefly spoke with his ex-girlfriend Kathy Etchingham, inviting her to visit him at his hotel that evening at 8:00p.m.; she declined the invitation because of prior engagements, and later admitted that she had "regretted it ever since". Hendrix and Dannemann then went to a Chelsea antiques market, where Hendrix purchased more clothing. After another stop to buy writing paper, which he used to compose his final lyrics, Dannemann and Hendrix drove to his suite at the Cumberland Hotel, meeting Devon Wilson as she walked down King's Road. Hendrix asked Dannemann to stop the car so that he could get out and talk with Wilson, who invited Hendrix to a party that evening. Dannemann became jealous, giving Wilson a cold stare during the brief meeting. Later, Phillip Harvey invited Dannemann and Hendrix to tea; they accepted. Prior to their arrival at Harvey's, they briefly stopped by the Cumberland.

While at the hotel, Hendrix made several telephone calls. Dannemann said he phoned his lawyer Henry Steingarten, asking him to find a way out of his contract with his manager Mike Jeffery, and producer Eddie Kramer, for whom Hendrix left a voice message. Mitch Mitchell said that he called Hendrix at the Cumberland on September 17, after having been asked to do so by tour manager Gerry Stickells, who had spoken to Hendrix just minutes earlier. Mitchell said that during the phone conversation Hendrix agreed to join him around midnight at the Speakeasy Club for a previously arranged jam session, which included Sly Stone.

Late afternoon and evening
After stopping at the Cumberland, Hendrix and Dannemann accompanied Harvey to his apartment, arriving around 5:30 p.m. Hendrix and Dannemann smoked hashish and drank tea and wine with Harvey and two of his female companions while discussing their individual careers. Sometime around 10:00p.m., Dannemann, apparently feeling left out of the conversation and jealous of the attention Hendrix was giving Harvey's female friends, became visibly upset and stormed out of the flat. Hendrix followed her, and an argument ensued between them during which Dannemann reportedly shouted: "you fucking pig". Harvey, concerned that their yelling would draw unwanted attention from the police, asked them to quiet down.

Harvey, who had remained silent about the incident out of respect for his English nobleman father, Arthur Vere Harvey, gave an affidavit after his father's death in 1994. In his statement, he claims to have been mildly concerned for Hendrix's safety, worried that Dannemann might "resort to serious physical violence". According to Harvey, Dannemann "verbally assaulted [Hendrix] in the most offensive possible way". Approximately 30 minutes later, Hendrix re-entered the flat and apologized for the outburst before leaving with Dannemann at 10:40 p.m. 
Dannemann said she then prepared a meal for them at her apartment around 11:00p.m. and shared a bottle of wine with Hendrix. Sometime after returning to the apartment, Hendrix took a bath, then wrote a poem titled "The Story of Life". He also called former producer/co-manager Chas Chandler and left a message on the answering machine, "I need help bad, man."

Early morning
At approximately 1:45 a.m. on Friday, September 18, Dannemann drove Hendrix to the party Wilson had invited him to earlier that day, which was hosted by Hendrix's acquaintance and business associate, Pete Kameron. At the party, Hendrix complained to Kameron about business problems, ate some food, and took at least one amphetamine tablet. Approximately 30 minutes later, Dannemann rang the flat's intercom asking for Hendrix. Another guest, Stella Douglas, asked her to return later. According to guest Angie Burdon, the estranged wife of Eric Burdon of the Animals, when Dannemann came back around 15 minutes later, Douglas used an assertive approach with her to the point of being impolite. Undeterred, Dannemann demanded to speak with Hendrix. Burdon recalled: "[Hendrix] got angry because [Dannemann] wouldn't leave him alone." According to Burdon, other guests at the party shouted out the windows at Dannemann, asking her to leave. Hendrix eventually yielded and spoke with Dannemann before unexpectedly leaving the party around 3:00a.m.

Dannemann, the only eyewitness to Hendrix's final hours, said that sometime after 3:00a.m., she prepared two tuna fish sandwiches for them after arriving back at her basement apartment. Around 4:00a.m., Hendrix, struggling with insomnia after having consumed amphetamines hours earlier, asked her for sleeping tablets. She later said she refused his request hoping he would fall asleep naturally. Dannemann said she surreptitiously took a sleeping tablet sometime around 6:00a.m., with Hendrix still awake. She awoke sometime between 10:0010:20 a.m. to find him sleeping normally in bed next to her. She said she then left to purchase cigarettes, and when she returned around 11:00a.m., found him in bed breathing, although unconscious and unresponsive. She telephoned for an ambulance at 11:18 a.m. and one arrived at 11:27 a.m.

When ambulance crew members Reg Jones and John Saua arrived at the Samarkand, the door to the flat was wide open, the gas fire was on, the curtains were drawn, and the apartment was dark. The crew called out several times, but after receiving no response, they entered and found Hendrix alone in bed. Dannemann was nowhere to be found. According to Jones: "Well, we had to get the police, we only had [Hendrix] and an empty flat, so John ran up and radioed, and got the aspirator ... It was horrific. He was covered in vomit. There was tons of it all over the pillow—black and brown it was. His airway was completely blocked all the way down ... We felt his pulse ... [shone] a light in his eyes. But there was no response at all." At 11:30 a.m., police officers Ian Smith and Tom Keene responded to a call for police assistance from the ambulance control centre. Jones commented: "Once the police arrived, which seemed like no time at all, we got [Hendrix] off to hospital as quick as we could."

The ambulance crew left the hotel at approximately 11:35 a.m. to take Hendrix to St Mary Abbots Hospital and they arrived at 11:45 a.m. Medical registrar Martin Seifert stated: "Jimi was rushed into the [resuscitation] room. He was put on a monitor, but it [ECG trace] was flat. I pounded his heart [CPR] a couple of times, but there was no point, he was dead". According to Seifert, the attempt to resuscitate Hendrix lasted "just a few minutes". The surgical registrar, John Bannister, commented: "He was cold and he was blue. He had all the parameters of someone who had been dead for some time. We worked on him for about half an hour without any response at all." Bannister pronounced Hendrix dead at 12:45 p.m., on Friday, September18, 1970; he was 27 years old. He later stated: "On admission he was obviously dead. He had no pulse, no heartbeat, and the attempt to resuscitate him was merely a formality."

Media response

During the morning of September 18, Eric Burdon arrived at the Samarkand sometime before the ambulance crew and found that Hendrix was already dead. Burdon immediately became concerned that police would find drugs at the apartment, and as he was collecting incriminating evidence, he found the poem that Hendrix had written hours earlier, "The Story of Life". Burdon, who said he had previously discussed suicide and death with Hendrix, assumed the poem was a suicide note. Under this assumption, he made comments to the press regarding his belief that Hendrix had committed suicide that he has since recanted: "I made false statements ... I simply didn't understand what the situation was. I misread the note ... I thought it was a goodbye". Dannemann said Hendrix told her: "I want you to keep this [poem] forever [and] I don't want you to forget anything that is written. It's a story about you and me".

Soon after Bannister pronounced Hendrix dead, a hospital spokesperson told the press: "We don't know where, how, or why he died, but he died of an overdose." By that evening, many newspapers in London and New York had printed sensationalized headlines that exploited the death-from-overdose account. Hendrix's public relations manager, Les Perrin, granted an interview on Dutch radio soon after the hospital announcement. He commented: "Well, all I know is that Mr. Hendrix's body was taken to St. Mary Abbots Hospital in Kensington, London, at 11:45 this morning, and he was certified to be dead on arrival." At 2:00p.m., BBC Radio 1 reported: "Jimi Hendrix, regarded by millions as one of the most talented and original performers in modern rock music, is dead." That evening, The New York Times described him as "a genius black musician, a guitarist, singer and composer of brilliantly dramatic power. He spoke in gestures as big as he could imagine and create."

On September 19, Dannemann spoke with a journalist for the German tabloid Bild. During the interview, published on September 24, Dannemann stated: "I loved him, and Jimi loved me ... We were already engaged ... I would then have designed the sleeves for his records ... He could not sleep. So I gave him the tablets." On September 20, a reporter from The Daily Telegraph interviewed Dannemann's brother, Klaus-Peter Dannemann, who stated: "[Monika] telephoned me on [September 19] and told me that [Hendrix] took nine sleeping tablets. She said that Jimi had told her that he wanted to sleep for a day and a half before he went to America. She told me that he did not intend to kill himself."

Post-mortem
To determine the cause of death, the coroner, Gavin Thurston, ordered a post-mortem examination on Hendrix's body, which was performed on September 21, by Professor Robert Donald Teare, a forensic pathologist. Teare reported that Hendrix was "well nourished and muscular", and he identified a quarter-inch scar on Hendrix's left wrist. He said that there were "no stigmata of [intravenous] drug addiction. Once these marks are there [in the skin], they never go away. In this case, there were no marks at all." Although Teare observed that the right side of Hendrix's heart was widely dilated, he found no evidence of valvular heart disease. He discovered a partially collapsed left lung and 400 ml of fluid in Hendrix's chest. Both lungs were congested, and vomit was found in the smaller bronchi. According to Teare, Hendrix's stomach "contained a medium-sized partially digested meal in which rice could be distinguished." Teare concluded that Hendrix's kidneys were healthy, and his liver was congested. His "bladder was half full of clear urine." He stated that Hendrix's blood alcohol content was 100 mg per 100 ml, "enough to fail a breathalyzer test ... the equivalent of about four pints of beer." Teare reported that analysis of Hendrix's blood "revealed a mixture of barbiturates consistent with those from Vesparax", and he estimated that drug concentrations translated to ingestion of 1.8 grams of barbiturate, 20 mg of amphetamine, and 20 mg of cannabis. Teare gave the cause of death as: "Inhalation of vomit due to barbiturate intoxication." He did not attempt to determine Hendrix's time of death.

Thurston began an inquest on September 23, and on September 28 he concluded that Hendrix had aspirated his own vomit and died of asphyxia while intoxicated with barbiturates. Citing "insufficient evidence of [the] circumstances", he recorded an open verdict. He commented: "The cause of death was clearly inhalation of vomit due to barbiturate intoxication, but there is no evidence as to intention to commit suicide ... If the question of intention cannot be answered, then it is proper to find the cause of death and leave it an open verdict." Dannemann later stated that Hendrix had taken nine of her prescribed Vesparax sleeping tablets. Intended to be taken in half-tablet doses, nine tablets of the powerful sedative amounted to 18 times the recommended amount.

After Hendrix's body had been embalmed by Desmond Henley, it was flown to Seattle, Washington, on September 29. After a service at Dunlap Baptist Church on October 1, he was interred at Greenwood Cemetery in Renton, Washington, the location of his mother's gravesite. Hendrix's family and friends traveled in 24 limousines. More than two hundred people attended the funeral, including several notable musicians such as the original Experience members Mitch Mitchell and Noel Redding, as well as Miles Davis, John Hammond and Johnny Winter.

Inconsistencies and the Scotland Yard inquiry
Tony Brown, author of Jimi Hendrix: The Final Days (1997), had been in regular contact with Dannemann from 1980 until her death in 1996. He visited with her on multiple occasions and spoke with her numerous times over the phone. Soon after contacting her, Brown came to the conclusion that her account of the events of Hendrix's final days "would change from one call to the next." In the days following Hendrix's death, she gave two significantly different accounts of the morning of September 18.

At approximately 4:00p.m. on September 18, Dannemann told Police Sergeant John Shaw: "We went to sleep about 7:00a.m. When I woke up at eleven his face was covered in vomit, and he was breathing noisily. I sent for an ambulance, and he was taken to hospital. I also noticed that ten of my sleeping tablets were missing." In a statement given to P. Weyell of the coroner's office on September 24, she said:

I made a sandwich and we talked until about 7:00a.m. He then said that he wanted to go to sleep. He took some tablets, and we went to bed. I woke up about 11:00a.m., and saw that Jimi's face was covered in vomit. I tried to wake him but could not. I called an ambulance and he was taken to the hospital in Kensington ... Prior to going with him to the hospital, I checked my supply of Vesparax sleeping tablets and found that nine of them were missing.

In Dannemann's initial statements, she said she awoke at 11a.m. on September 18. During the inquest she stated that she awoke at 10:20 a.m., and left to purchase cigarettes, something she had previously failed to mention. In 1971, she wrote a manuscript in which she said she awoke at 10a.m. In 1975, during an interview with author Caesar Glebbeek, Dannemann stated that she awoke at 9a.m. According to Burdon, Dannemann phoned him as "the first light of dawn was coming through the window." Stickells said he received a phone call regarding a problem with Hendrix "between 8 a.m. and 9 a.m." Mitchell said he waited for Hendrix at the Speakeasy Club until they closed at 4a.m., and a couple of hours after his hour and a half drive home, he received a phone call from Stickells, who told him Hendrix had died. In her statements to the police and coroner's office, Dannemann never mentioned telephoning Burdon.

Although Dannemann claimed that Hendrix was alive when placed in the ambulance at approximately 11:30 a.m. and that she rode with him on the way to the hospital, the ambulance crew later denied she was there. Statements from the paramedics who responded to the call support that they found Hendrix alone in the flat when they arrived at 11:27 a.m., fully clothed and apparently already dead. Jones later commented: "[When] we arrived at the flat, the door was flung wide open, nobody about, just the body on the bed." Saua stated: "There was just me and the casualty and Reg the driver. Nobody else." Burdon stated: "[Dannemann] didn't leave in the ambulance; she was with me". According to Jones, Hendrix's bowels and bladder had released some of their contents prior to the ambulance crew's arrival at the Samarkand. Saua stated that the vomit was dry when they arrived, making use of their aspirator ineffective. Saua commented: "When we moved [Hendrix], the gases were gurgling, you get that when someone has died". According to police officer Smith: "The ambulance men were there, but Jimi was dead ... There was really nothing they could do for him." Smith also disputes Dannemann's claim that she was there with Hendrix at the flat and in the ambulance:

No, I remember quite clearly the doors shutting on the crew and Jimi ... there was no one about. If she had been in the flat, they would never have called us to come ... But because no one was there, he was dead, and circumstances were a little odd, suspicious, they radioed ... us in. It wasn't until later in the day that I found out that it was Jimi Hendrix.

In 1992, after having conducted an extensive review of the events of September 18, 1970, the London Ambulance Service issued an official statement: "There was no one else, except the deceased, at the flat when they arrived; nor did anyone else accompany them in the ambulance to St. Mary Abbotts Hospital."

In 1992, having arranged for a private investigation of Hendrix's death, Etchingham supplied the results of the effort to UK authorities and requested they reopen the coroner's inquest. After a several-month inquiry by Scotland Yard, during which every interested party to the events was interviewed, officials were confident the request would be granted. The investigation eventually proved inconclusive in 1993, when Attorney General Sir Nicholas Lyell decided that proceeding with the investigation would not serve the public, owing in part to the excessive time that had passed since Hendrix's death.

Explanatory notes

Citations

General and cited sources

Further reading

 
 
 
 
 
 
 

 Documentaries

External links
 Fan page on the death of Hendrix

1970 in London
1970 in music
September 1970 events in the United Kingdom
Deaths by person in London
Jimi Hendrix
Barbiturates-related deaths
Drug-related deaths in England
Accidental deaths in London
Deaths from asphyxiation
Alcohol-related deaths in England
20th century in the Royal Borough of Kensington and Chelsea
Notting Hill